Jonathan Winter (born 18 August 1971 in Masterton) is a member of the Ngāi Tahu Maori tribe and a former backstroke swimmer from New Zealand, who competed at the 1996 Summer Olympics in Atlanta, United States, for his native country. At the 1995 FINA World SC Championships in Rio de Janeiro, Brazil he won the gold medal with the Men's 4 × 100 medley relay team.

Winter also competed in three consecutive Commonwealth Games, starting in 1994. His first outing for the National Team was in Spain at the first World Short Course Championships (1993). Winter also won four consecutive Backstroke categories (1993/94/95/96) at the Oceania Grand Prix and represented his Country in All strokes and Individual Medley. He held National Records in Butterfly, Backstroke and Individual Medley. Winter retired in 1998 but made a comeback in 2002 (Manchester Commonwealth Games - placed 6th 50 Butterfly) and became the oldest Male to win a National Title in the 50 Freestyle aged 31yrs 7mths. 
He is the youngest grandson of Frank Winter.
He began coaching the F.R.C.C swimming club in Wellington in 1991 as Junior coach to Head Coach Gary Hurring. Winter moved to Hastings in 1998 and formed Heretaunga Sundevils who became hugely successful during the early to mid 2000s - Winter then moved to Auckland and formed United Swimming Club another very successful organisation.  
Winter is currently the head coach at Raptors Swimming club and Coastal Warriors on the Kapiti Coast and was Coach for the Tongan Olympic Swimming Team at London 2012.

References
 Profile on NZ Olympic Committee
 

1971 births
Living people
Ngāi Tahu people
Olympic swimmers of New Zealand
Swimmers at the 1996 Summer Olympics
Sportspeople from Masterton
New Zealand male backstroke swimmers
Swimmers at the 1994 Commonwealth Games
Swimmers at the 1998 Commonwealth Games
Swimmers at the 2002 Commonwealth Games
Medalists at the FINA World Swimming Championships (25 m)
Commonwealth Games competitors for New Zealand